The Canadian Real Estate Association (CREA; , ACI) is a trade association that represents real estate brokers, agents, and salespeople in Canada.

CREA's membership includes over 130,000 individuals, working through 90 real estate boards and associations across Canada. CREA is governed by an elected board of directors, which has representation from each region of Canada and features director-at-large positions. Currently, there are 16 seats on the board.

See also
 List of real estate topics
 National Association of Realtors
 Real estate broker
 Real estate trends
 REM (magazine)

References

External links
 Canadian Real Estate Association
 Canadian Real Estate Association Facebook Page
 DANGER Report

Real estate industry trade groups based in Canada
1943 establishments in Canada